Bendigo Airport , is located in East Bendigo just north of Bendigo, Victoria, Australia, just off the Midland Highway. The airport is located approximately 10 minutes away from the Bendigo CBD.

In 2017, Bendigo Airport was upgraded with a new taxiway system, new lighting and a new 1.6 km north–south runway. New lighting and signage was also added.

Facilities 
Bendigo Airport has a small terminal building which is located on the western side.

The airport has 25 private hangars for small aircraft. The hangars are located at the northern end of the terminal.

Airlines and destinations

Other operators
 Air Ambulance Victoria
 Bendigo Aviation Services (BAS)
 Bendigo Flying Club (BFC)
 Bendigo Recreational Aviation School
 MyJet
 RMIT Flight Training School

Accidents and incidents 
 On 19 May 2015, a Cirrus SR22T registered VH-EPG from Moorabbin to Mildura declared a PAN PAN after smoke built up in the cockpit. On approach the aircraft cleared a row of trees and made a final landing on runway 17. Emergency crews responded to the emergency. The pilot and passenger were not injured.
 On 17 December 2017, an ultralight plane crashed during takeoff. The aircraft was registered 23-8769. The pilot and the instructor were taken to Bendigo Hospital with minor injuries. Emergency services were called to the scene. The cause of the crash remains unknown. Recreational Aviation Australia investigated the accident.
 On 15 August 2019, an ultralight plane experienced a hard landing resulting in a nose wheel collapse during a training flight. The aircraft was an ICP Savannah registered 24-7795. The main north–south runways 17/35 were closed for 3 hours. En-route aircraft were diverted to nearby airstrips. Emergency services responded and firefighters used foam on a small fuel leak from the plane. The two pilots were uninjured.

See also
 List of airports in Victoria

References

External links
Bendigo Airport | City of Greater Bendigo
Aviation Photos: Bendigo (BXG / YBDG) at Airliners.net
Video of Prince Charles Taking off Bendigo Airport (BXG / YBDG) 

Airports in Victoria (Australia)
Transport in Bendigo
Bendigo